Nikolay Zhirov (sometimes shown as Nikolai Schirov) is a Soviet bobsledder who competed in the mid-1980s. He won a bronze medal in the two-man event at the 1985 FIBT World Championships in Cervinia.

References
Bobsleigh two-man world championship medalists since 1931

Year of birth missing (living people)
Living people
Russian male bobsledders
Soviet male bobsledders